Brad Oates (born September 30, 1953, in Mesa, Arizona) is a former American Football player who appeared with five teams. Oates played collegiate football at BYU.

Brad's brother Bart also played offensive lineman in the NFL for eleven seasons for the New York Giants and San Francisco 49ers. Both were teammates for the Philadelphia Stars of the USFL.

1953 births
Living people
American football centers
St. Louis Cardinals (football) players
Detroit Lions players
Kansas City Chiefs players
Green Bay Packers players
BYU Cougars football players
Philadelphia/Baltimore Stars players
Players of American football from Arizona